The Archaeological Museum of Alicante (abbreviated as MARQ) is an archaeological museum in Alicante, Spain. The museum won the European Museum of the Year Award in 2004, a few years after significant expansion and reallocation to renovated buildings of the antique hospital of San Juan de Dios. The museum houses eight galleries that use multimedia to allow visitors to interact with the lives of past residents of the region.

See also 

 List of museums in Spain

References

External links 
Museum website
Archaeological Museum of Alicante within Google Arts & Culture

Alicante
Museums in Alicante
Bien de Interés Cultural landmarks in the Province of Alicante